Sipek is a surname, typically an anglicization or a transliteration of Czech Šípek or Croatian Šipek. Notable people with the surname include:

 Bořek Šípek (1949–2016), Czech architect
 Dick Sipek (1923–2005), American baseball player
 Jakub Šípek (born 1999), Czech footballer
 Miro Sipek (born 1948), Australian rifle shooting coach
 Steve Sipek (1942–2019), American actor

See also
 

Czech-language surnames